Luigi Taveri (19 September 1929 – 1 March 2018) was a Swiss professional Grand Prix motorcycle road racer. He competed in the FIM motorcycle Grand Prix world championships from 1954 to 1966. Taveri is notable for being a three-time 125cc road racing world champion. Although he specialised in the smaller engined machines, Taveri is the only competitor to have scored points in six Grand Prix classes: 50cc, 125cc, 250cc, 350cc, 500cc and Sidecars. In 2016, he was named an FIM Legend for his motorcycling achievements.

Racing career
Taveri made his world championship debut in the 1954 season, racing in the 500 cc class on a Norton motorcycle. In 1955, he took his first win in the 125 cc race at the Spanish Grand Prix. He took one more win in 1955, in the 250 cc class at the Dutch TT.

He participated in the Isle of Man TT on several occasions from 1955 to 1966 with three victories and several second places amongst his results.

During his career he rode for MV Agusta, and became a works rider for Ducati, MZ, Kreidler and in 1961 for Honda. His final Grand Prix victory at the 1966 125cc Italian Grand Prix came 11 years and 133 days after his first win, marking one of the longest winning careers in the Grand Prix motorcycle racing history. Over his racing career Taveri had 30 victories and 89 podiums in all classes, including three Isle of Man TT victories. After retiring from competition, he continued in the sport by demonstrating historic machines.

Taveri died on 1 March 2018 of complications from a stroke at the age of 88.

Motorcycle Grand Prix results

(key) (Races in italics indicate fastest lap)

References

1929 births
2018 deaths
Swiss motorcycle racers
500cc World Championship riders
350cc World Championship riders
250cc World Championship riders
125cc World Championship riders
50cc World Championship riders
Isle of Man TT riders
Swiss-Italian people
Swiss people of Italian descent
People from Horgen
Sportspeople from the canton of Zürich
125cc World Riders' Champions